Frank Edwin "Tug" McGraw Jr. (August 30, 1944 – January 5, 2004) was an American professional baseball relief pitcher and long-time Major League Baseball (MLB) player, often remembered for coining the phrase "Ya Gotta Believe", which became the rallying cry for the 1973 New York Mets. 

McGraw recorded the final out of the 1980 World Series against the Kansas City Royals, striking out Willie Wilson to bring the Philadelphia Phillies their first World Series championship, ending the Phillies' 77-year drought. He was the last active big league player to have played under manager Casey Stengel.

Early life
Frank Edwin "Tug" McGraw Jr. was born August 30, 1944, in Martinez, California, northeast of San Francisco, to Frank Edwin "Big Mac" McGraw, Sr. and Mable McKenna. McGraw got the nickname "Tug" from his mother because of the particularly aggressive way he breast-fed. Frank Sr. was the great-grandson of Irish immigrants. After his divorce in the early 1950s, Frank Sr. moved his three sons to nearby Vallejo, and Tug graduated from St. Vincent Ferrer High School in Vallejo in 1962. He enrolled in Vallejo Junior College and signed with the New York Mets as an amateur free agent on June 12, 1964, upon graduation.

Marine Corps Reserve service
After one season in Major League Baseball with the New York Mets, McGraw reported to the Marine Corps Recruit Depot Parris Island on September 23, 1965, along with fellow New York Met pitcher Jim Bethke. He was trained as a rifleman on the M14 rifle and M60 machine gun. McGraw later reported to Marine Corps Base Camp Lejeune, where he (in his own words) became a "trained killer".

For McGraw, one of the most challenging aspects of being in the military was the internal conflict which stirred within him. At the same time that he was finishing his Marine training, his younger brother Dennis was staging anti-war protests at Vallejo J.C., where he was then a student. In a March 5, 1967, New York Times article, McGraw admitted that he and his brother would have arguments over the way the Vietnam War was being conducted. But even he, with his six-year Reserve commitment to the United States Marine Corps looming large over him, would admit that he was a "dove when it came to the way [the United States was] conducting the war."

Baseball career

New York Mets
McGraw was used both as a starting pitcher and out of the bullpen in the minors; and, after less than one season in the Mets' farm system at Cocoa Beach, Florida, and Auburn, New York, where he went 6–4 with a 1.64 earned run average in Rookie and class A ball, McGraw made the Mets out of Spring training in 1965 at age 20, without ever having played double- or triple-A ball. Soon after, when asked if he preferred the new AstroTurf on the field at the Houston Astrodome to real grass, he said, "I don't know, I never smoked AstroTurf."

McGraw made the team as a reliever, and was 0–1 with a 3.12 ERA and one save when he made his first major league start on July 28 against the Chicago Cubs in the second game of a double header at Wrigley Field. He lasted just two-thirds of an inning and gave up three earned runs on his way to a 9–0 loss (the Cubs blew the Mets out in the first game as well, 7–2). On August 22, in his second start, also in the second game of a double header, only this time against the St. Louis Cardinals at Shea Stadium, McGraw pitched a complete game to earn his first major league win. He won his next start as well, 5–2 over Sandy Koufax and the Los Angeles Dodgers. It marked the first time the Mets had ever beaten the future Hall of Famer. McGraw remained in the Mets' starting rotation for the remainder of the season, however, failed to log another win, going 2–6 as a starter, and 0–1 in relief.

The Mets used McGraw as a starter again in 1966, and he was 2–9 with a 5.52 ERA in that role. Though he also made four starts with the Mets in 1967, McGraw spent most of the season, and all of 1968 in the minor leagues with the Jacksonville Suns. By the time he returned to the Mets in 1969, manager Gil Hodges had a very capable young pitching rotation that included Tom Seaver, Jerry Koosman, and Gary Gentry and had no need for McGraw as a starter until Koosman went down with an injury in May. McGraw went 1–1 with a 5.23 ERA filling in for Koosman.

Koosman returned to the rotation at the end of the month and on May 28, after a five-game losing streak that saw the Mets fall into fourth place in the newly aligned National League East, Koosman and the expansion San Diego Padres' Clay Kirby engaged in a pitchers' duel at Shea. After nine scoreless innings by Kirby and ten by Koosman, the game was turned over to the bullpens for extra innings. The game finally ended after 11 innings when Bud Harrelson hit a single to drive in Cleon Jones. McGraw pitched the 11th inning to earn the win.

This began an 11-game winning streak that brought them into second place, seven games behind the Chicago Cubs. McGraw earned two saves during that stretch, and 12 for the season. His record as a reliever was 8–2 with a 1.47 ERA.

The Cubs had been in first place in the NL East for 156 days of the season, and they seemed likely to win the division when they came to New York City to open a crucial two-game series with the Mets on September 8. The Mets won both games to close within a half game of the Cubs. The following day, the Mets swept a double header from the expansion Montreal Expos. Coupled with a Cubs loss (who had slumped to a 9–17 record in their final 26 games), the Mets moved into first place for the first time ever during the  season.

On September 15, the St. Louis Cardinals' Steve Carlton struck out a record 19 Mets in a losing effort, as the Mets defeated the Cards 4–3 at Busch Memorial Stadium on a pair of two-run home runs by Ron Swoboda. McGraw pitched the final three innings without giving up a run to earn the win in this game. On September 24, facing Carlton and the Cardinals, again — only this time at Shea Stadium, the New York Mets clinched the NL East as Donn Clendenon hit two home runs in a 6–0 Mets victory. The Mets won 39 of their last 50 games, and finished the season with 100 wins against 62 losses, eight games over the second place Cubs.

McGraw's first postseason appearance came in game two of the new National League Championship Series (NLCS). After the Atlanta Braves lit up Koosman for six runs in  innings, Ron Taylor and McGraw held the Braves scoreless the remainder of the way to secure the Mets' 11–6 victory. He did not appear in any other games during the 1969 postseason.

Although McGraw pitched sparingly in the 1969 post season, he remembered the year quite fondly, saying, "Everything changed for me in 1969, the year we turned out to be goddamned amazing, all right."

"Ya Gotta Believe!"
McGraw emerged as one of the top closers in the National League in the early 1970s, enjoying a career year in 1972. He was 3–3 with a 2.01 ERA and 15 saves at the All-Star break to earn his first All-Star selection. McGraw pitched two innings, striking out four and giving up only one hit to earn the win in the NL's 4–3 come from behind victory. For the season, McGraw went 8–6 with a 1.70 ERA, giving up just 71 hits in 106 innings pitched, and setting a Mets record with 27 saves that lasted until 1984.

Whereas 1973 wasn't as good a year statistically for McGraw, he was valued for the leadership role he assumed for the league champions. The Mets had fallen into last place in the NL East, and had remained there through August 30. McGraw was the winning pitcher for the Mets on August 31 when the Mets emerged from last place with an extra innings victory over the St. Louis Cardinals. The win improved McGraw's record to 2–6 with a 5.05 ERA.

For the remainder of the season, McGraw went 3–0 with a 0.57 ERA and ten saves. The Mets, meanwhile, went 20–8 from that point forward to pull off the stunning division title. At a July 9 team meeting where Mets Board Chairman M. Donald Grant was trying to encourage the team, McGraw shouted the words, "Ya Gotta Believe" which became a popular rallying cry for the Mets. He said the famous phrase when maybe only he believed the Mets could actually get to the World Series. But soon enough, hearing McGraw say it again and again, seeing him do his magic in the ninth, the Mets themselves came to believe. They pulled into first place on September 21 with a 10–2 victory over the Pittsburgh Pirates, and clinched the division crown on the final day of the season with a win over the Cubs.

McGraw continued his dominant pitching into the postseason, when he pitched five innings over two games in the NLCS against the defending NL champion Cincinnati Reds without giving up a run, and appeared in five of the seven games of the World Series against the defending champion Oakland Athletics. Though he blew the save in game two, he pitched three shutout innings in extra innings to earn the win.

McGraw was traded along with Don Hahn and Dave Schneck from the Mets to the Philadelphia Phillies for Del Unser, John Stearns, and Mac Scarce at the Winter Meetings on December 3, 1974. McGraw had developed shoulder trouble during a season in which he went 6–11 with a 4.15 ERA, and at the time of the trade, it appeared as if the Mets may have been unloading damaged goods. After the trade, he was diagnosed with a simple cyst and after successful surgery to remove it, recovered completely. McGraw left the Mets as the all-time leader in saves, games pitched, and games finished.

Philadelphia Phillies
With the Phillies, he continued his role as a reliable relief pitcher, earning his second career All-Star nod in his first season in Philadelphia, though he did not appear in the game. After finishing second to the Pirates in 1975, McGraw's Phillies won their division crown the next three seasons. They were, however, unable to reach the World Series as they were swept by Cincinnati's "Big Red Machine" in the 1976 NLCS, and fell to the Los Angeles Dodgers the following two seasons.

McGraw was nearly traded along with Bake McBride and Larry Christenson to the Texas Rangers for Sparky Lyle and Johnny Grubb at the 1979 Winter Meetings in Toronto, but the proposed transaction was never executed because a deferred money issue in Lyle's contract went unresolved.

The Phillies were battling back-and-forth for first place with the Montreal Expos in 1980 when the Expos came to Veterans Stadium for a crucial three game set on September 25. The Phillies won two of the three, with McGraw winning the second game, to pull a half game up on Montreal. By the time the Phillies went to Montreal for the final series of the season, the two teams were tied for first place.

The Phillies won the opener, 2–1. McGraw earned the save by striking out five of the six batters he faced. The following day, McGraw entered the game in the ninth inning, with the score tied at four. McGraw pitched three innings, striking out three and only giving up one hit (a tenth-inning lead-off single by Jerry White. It was also one of just two balls to leave the infield once McGraw entered the game). After Mike Schmidt's 11th-inning home run put the Phillies up 6–4, McGraw pitched a 1–2–3 11th inning, striking out Larry Parrish to end the game, and clinch the National League East for the Phillies for the fourth time since joining the club.

For the season, McGraw went 5–4 with a 1.46 ERA, 75 strikeouts and 20 saves. Phillies starter Steve Carlton won the National League Cy Young Award, and slugging third baseman Mike Schmidt was the unanimous NL MVP. McGraw received consideration in balloting for both awards as well, finishing fifth in Cy Young balloting, and 16th for league MVP.

1980 World Champions

McGraw pitched in all five games of the 1980 NLCS against the Houston Astros. The Phillies won the first game 3–1, with McGraw earning the save. The Astros, however, came back in game two with an extra innings victory to send the series to Houston tied at a game apiece.

McGraw entered game three in the eighth inning with a runner on second, and one out. He managed to get out of the inning, and keep the Astros scoreless until the 11th inning, when Joe Morgan led the inning off with a triple. Rafael Landestoy entered the game as a pinch runner for Morgan, and McGraw intentionally walked the next two batters to create a force at any base. The strategy didn't work, as the following batter, Denny Walling, hit a sacrifice fly to Greg Luzinski in left field scoring Landestoy.

The final two games of the series also went into extra innings. He earned a save in game four to even the series, however, blew the save in the fifth and deciding game, allowing it to go into extra innings. Dick Ruthven entered the game in the ninth and pitched two perfect innings. Meanwhile, the Phillies came back with a run in the tenth to proceed to the World Series against the Kansas City Royals.

McGraw appeared in four of the six games of the World Series, striking out ten batters in 7.2 innings. The Phillies swept the first two games in Philadelphia, with McGraw earning the save in game one. The Royals, however, came back to even the series after two games in Kansas City, with McGraw picking up the loss in game three.

McGraw entered game five in the seventh inning with the Phillies behind 3–2. He pitched three scoreless innings, while his team scored two ninth inning runs off Royals closer Dan Quisenberry to head back to Philadelphia with a 3–2 series lead. McGraw entered game six of the World Series in the eighth inning with no outs, and runners on first and second, and the Phillies up, 4–0. He allowed one inherited base runner to score, but managed to get through the inning relatively unscathed. After giving up a walk and two singles to load the bases in the ninth inning, he struck out Willie Wilson, clinching the Phillies' first World Series championship.

The next day, at a victory rally at John F. Kennedy Stadium, McGraw summed it all up for the fans after 97 years of futility for the Phillies franchise:

{{quote|All through baseball history, Philadelphia has had to take a back seat to New York City. Well, New York City can take this world championship and stick it! 'CAUSE WE'RE NUMBER ONE!}}

In later years, McGraw expressed remorse toward his comments toward New York. He returned to Shea Stadium on numerous occasions following his retirement, citing his love for the Mets fans.

Final four seasons
McGraw went 2–4 with a 2.66 ERA and ten saves in the strike-shortened 1981 season. The Phillies won the first half season crown, however, lost the 1981 National League Division Series to the Montreal Expos. On March 17, 1981, McGraw wore a dyed green uniform on St. Patrick's Day to a spring training game, though an umpire refused to let him play. McGraw called St. Patrick's Day his favorite holiday. Since 1989, the Phillies have had a tradition of playing in green on St. Patrick's Day.

In 1982, McGraw shifted into more of a set-up man role, with both Ron Reed and Ed Farmer earning more saves than he on the season. Prior to the start of the 1983 season, the Phillies acquired Al Holland from the San Francisco Giants to assume the closer role. Following the 1984 season, McGraw retired at age 40. As a favor to longtime friend Roman Gabriel, he returned to professional baseball for single starts during the 1989 and 1990 minor league seasons with the Class A Gastonia Rangers of the South Atlantic League.

Career stats

Whereas relief pitchers are not given the opportunity to bat frequently, McGraw was allowed to bat leading off the sixth inning of a 6–0 blowout at the hands of the Montreal Expos on September 8, . He rewarded his manager's faith in him by putting the Mets on the board with his only career home run.

McGraw could also throw right-handed and would often loosen up before games by playing right-handed catch with his teammates, leaving fans wondering who that right-hander wearing number 45 was. At the time of his death, McGraw was ranked:
24th on the all-time major league list in games pitched (824)
22nd on the all-time major league list in games finished (541)
4th on the all-time Mets list in games saved (86)
4th on the all-time Mets list in games finished (228)
5th on the all-time Mets list in most games pitched (361)
7th on the all-time Mets list in least hits per nine innings (7.78)
10th on the all-time Mets list in most batters struck out per nine innings (7.02)
1st on the all-time Phillies list in games finished (313)
3rd on the all-time Phillies list in games pitched (500)
4th on the all-time Phillies list in saves (94)
8th on the all-time Phillies list in least hits per nine innings (7.89)

Other work
In the 1980s and 1990s, he was a sports anchor and reporter for Action News on WPVI, the ABC affiliate in Philadelphia. He appeared as himself in a 1999 episode of Everybody Loves Raymond along with several other members of the 1969 New York Mets.

In the mid-1970s, McGraw collaborated with artist Michael Witte on a nationally syndicated comic strip "Scroogie". Scroogie was a relief pitcher for the "Pets", whose teammates included "Tyrone" (a Reggie Jackson-like bopper with a tremendous ego), ace pitcher "Royce Rawls" (loosely based upon former Mets teammate, Tom Seaver), "Chico" at shortstop and "Homer", an intellectually challenged slugger who could send a ball into orbit. Their announcer, "Herb", wore loud sports coats reminiscent of former Mets announcer Lindsey Nelson, and the team was owned by Millicent Cashman. Actual major league teams and players were used in the comic strip during its two-year run.

McGraw, Witte, David Fisher and Neil Offer produced two books, Scroogie (1976) and Hello there, ball! (1977).

McGraw also recorded a version of the baseball poem "Casey at the Bat", accompanied by Peter Nero and the Philly Pops.

Personal life
McGraw had a brief relationship in 1966 with Betty D'Agostino that resulted in a son, country music singer Tim McGraw. In his book Ya Gotta Believe, McGraw wrote that he and D'Agostino only had sex once, and that she immediately broke off contact with him and left town afterward. At the time, McGraw was playing baseball for Jacksonville, while D'Agostino was a high school student. When she became pregnant, her parents sent D'Agostino to Louisiana to live with relatives.

McGraw did not acknowledge Tim as his son until Tim was 17 years old. Tim McGraw, in an April 19, 2022, interview on NPR's Fresh Air, stated that he met McGraw only twice as a child, both times at baseball games in Houston. The first time, they had a lunch with the elder McGraw telling the younger they could be friends but he could not be a father to him. In a second meeting, Tim said Tug worked out in the bullpen and ignored him. The two later developed a close relationship after McGraw agreed to finance Tim's college education. In addition to Tim, McGraw had a son Mark and daughter Cari with his first wife Phyllis Kline, and a son, Matthew, with his wife Diane Hovenkamp-Robertson; he also had two stepsons, Christopher and Ian Hovenkamp.

Death
On March 12, 2003, McGraw was working as an instructor for the Phillies during spring training when he was hospitalized with a glioblastoma brain tumor. After surgery was performed to remove it, initial reports suggested the procedure had been successful, his chances for recovery were "excellent" and he would live "a long time". However, the tumor was not totally excised by the surgery and the malignancy returned in inoperable form. McGraw lived for over nine months after the initial surgery. In what would be his last public appearance, McGraw attended the closing ceremonies of Veterans Stadium in Philadelphia on September 28, 2003, where he recreated the final out of the Phillies' World Series triumph. McGraw died on January 5, 2004. The Mets played the 2004 season with the words "Ya Gotta Believe" embroidered on their left shoulders in McGraw's honor and the Phillies wore a patch on their right shoulder featuring a shamrock in honor of McGraw and a banner reading "Pope" in honor of longtime Phillies executive Paul Owens, who had also died that winter. His son Tim's 2004 hit "Live Like You Were Dying" (written by Tim Nichols and Craig Wiseman) was recorded in his father's honor and featured the memorable clip of McGraw recording the final out of the 1980 World Series in the music video. The song reached #1 on the U.S. Billboard country music charts and held that position for a total of seven weeks. It was named as the Number One country song of 2004 by Billboard.

McGraw was cremated after his death. Nearly five years later, his son Tim McGraw took a handful of his dad's ashes and spread them on the pitcher's mound at the Phillies current home park, Citizens Bank Park, in Game 3 of the 2008 World Series. The Phillies won the game, defeating the Tampa Bay Rays 5–4, en route to the team's second World Series Championship.

Legacy
The Tug McGraw Foundation was established in 2003 to enhance the quality of life of children and adults with brain tumors and in 2009 expanded programs to include posttraumatic stress disorder (PTSD) and traumatic brain injury (TBI). TMF collaborates and partners with other organizations to accelerate new treatments and cures to improve quality of life in areas of physical, social, emotional, cognitive, and spiritual impact of those debilitating conditions. The Foundation broke ground for its new headquarters in Yountville, California on November 13, 2010.

The Foundation's work includes sponsoring a photography class at Camp Pendleton to help 15 Marines as part of the recovery process from battlefield wounds.

Honors and awards
In 1980, the Philadelphia Sports Writers Association presented its annual Good Guy Award to McGraw.

In 1983—the 100th anniversary of the founding of the Phillies—McGraw was selected as one of only two left-handed pitchers on the Phillies Centennial Team.

In 1993, McGraw was inducted into the New York Mets Hall of Fame.

In 1999, the Philadelphia Phillies inducted McGraw into the Philadelphia Baseball Wall of Fame.

In 2004, the Philadelphia chapter of the Baseball Writers' Association of America began its annual presentation of four awards to four members of the Philadelphia Phillies franchise for "season-ending achievements", including the "Tug McGraw Good Guy Award".

In 2010, McGraw was inducted into the Philadelphia Sports Hall of Fame.

See also

 Kashatus, William C. Almost A Dynasty: The Rise and Fall of the 1980 Phillies. Philadelphia: University of Pennsylvania Press, 2008. 
 McGraw, Tug with William C. Kashatus. Was It As Good For You? Tug McGraw & Friends Recall the 1980 World Series. Media, PA: McGraw & Co. Inc. 2000.
 McGraw, Tug with Don Yaeger. Ya Gotta Believe! My Roller-Coaster Life as a Screwball Pitcher and Part-Time Father, and My Hope-Filled Fight Against Brain Cancer. NY: New American Library, 2004.
 McGraw, Tug with Joseph Durso. Screwball''. Boston: Houghton Mifflin, 1974.

Footnotes

External links

 
 Tug McGraw at SABR (Baseball BioProject)
 Tug McGraw at Baseball Almanac
 Tug McGraw at Baseball Library
 Tug McGraw at Ultimate Mets Database
 
 Tug McGraw at SoSH (Sons of Sam Horn)
 The Tug McGraw Foundation
 History: Tributes: Tug McGraw / 1944–2004. MLB.com
 The Deadball Era
 Genealogy: Family Group Sheet of Tug McGRAW
 Tug McGraw rides a ten-speed bike and talks about bicycle safety in 1974 in this public service announcement from the Office of Traffic Safety, State of California, which is part of the Governor and the Students videotape series at the Hoover Institution Archives.

1944 births
2004 deaths
Auburn Mets players
Baseball players from California
Deaths from brain cancer in the United States
Deaths from glioblastoma
Gastonia Rangers players
Jacksonville Suns players
Major League Baseball pitchers
National League All-Stars
New York Mets players
People from Martinez, California
Philadelphia Phillies players
Screwball pitchers
United States Marine Corps non-commissioned officers
United States Marine Corps reservists
Cocoa Rookie League Mets players
Florida Instructional League Mets players